The enzyme aminobenzoate decarboxylase catalyzes the chemical reaction

4(or 2)-aminobenzoate  aniline + CO2

Thus, the two substrates of this enzyme are 4-aminobenzoate and 2-aminobenzoate, whereas its two products are aniline and CO2.

This enzyme belongs to the family of lyases, specifically the carboxy-lyases, which cleave carbon-carbon bonds.  The systematic name of this enzyme class is aminobenzoate carboxy-lyase (aniline-forming). It employs one cofactor, pyridoxal phosphate.

References

 

EC 4.1.1
Pyridoxal phosphate enzymes
Enzymes of unknown structure